Intruder is a 2016 American horror film written and directed by Travis Zariwny. The film stars Steven Beckingham, Teresa Decher, Louise Linton, Susannah Mars, Mary McDonald-Lewis and Moby. The film was released on June 24, 2016, by IFC Midnight. Its plot follows a Portland, Oregon cellist who finds herself attacked by an intruder during a storm.

Cast

Teresa Decher as Emily
Louise Linton as Elizabeth
Susannah Mars as Grace
Mary McDonald-Lewis as Mrs. Pillar
Moby as Vincent
Zach Myers as Justin
John Robinson as John
Aaron Trainor as Chester
Ire Wardlaw as Marty
Dakota Zariwny as Dakota

Release
The film was released on June 24, 2016, by IFC Midnight.

References

External links
 

2016 films
2016 horror films
American horror films
Films set in Portland, Oregon
Films shot in Portland, Oregon
2010s English-language films
Films directed by Travis Zariwny
2010s American films